Hendecasis is a genus of moths of the family Crambidae described by George Hampson in 1896.

Species
Hendecasis apicefulva Hampson, 1916
Hendecasis apiciferalis (Walker, 1866)
Hendecasis duplifascialis (Hampson, 1891)
Hendecasis fulviplaga Hampson, 1916
Hendecasis fumilauta Warren, 1896
Hendecasis melalophalis Hampson, 1906
Hendecasis pulchella (Hampson, 1916)

References

Cybalomiinae
Crambidae genera
Taxa named by George Hampson